Phosphinates or hypophosphites are a class of phosphorus compounds conceptually based on the structure of hypophosphorous acid. IUPAC prefers the term phosphinate in all cases, however in practice hypophosphite is usually used to describe inorganic species (e.g. sodium hypophosphite), while phosphinate typically refers to organophosphorus species.

Hypophosphites

The salts are prepared by heating white phosphorus in warm aqueous alkali e.g. Ca(OH)2:

P4 + 2 Ca(OH)2 + 4 H2O → 2 Ca(H2PO2)2 + 2 H2

Hypophosphites are reducing agents:

  + 3 OH− →  + 2 H2O + 2 e−

Hypophosphites are used in electroless nickel plating as the reducing agent to deposit for example Ni metal from Ni salts. The hypophosphite ion is thermodynamically unstable, and disproportionates on heating to phosphine and phosphate salts:

 2  → PH3 +

See also
Organophosphinic acid
Phosphine - PR3
Phosphine oxide - OPR3
Phosphite - P(OR)3
Phosphonate - OP(OR)2R
Phosphate - OP(OR)3

References

Functional groups